John Lovelace, 4th Baron Lovelace (16721709) was the Governor of both New York and New Jersey.

Biography
He was the son of William Lovelace of Hurst, Berkshire. He was the grandson of Francis Lovelace, son of Richard Lovelace, 1st Baron Lovelace. Despite being born into an aristocratic family, the 3rd Baron Lovelace had weakened the family's fortunes through gambling, leaving John heavily in debt. He served in the military following the inheritance of his peerage. In 1701, Lord Lovelace married Charlotte, the daughter of Sir John Clayton, but her poor dowry little improved his financial situation. The couple had six children: John (d. 1709), Charlotte (d. 1705), Charles (d. 1707), Wentworth (d. 1709), Neville (d. 1736) and Martha (d. 1788), who married Lord Henry Beauclerk in 1739.

No portraits of the 4th Baron Lovelace have surfaced to date. However, in 1705 he was described by an English writer named John Macky as follows: "Lieutenant Colonel of the Horse Guards; a very pretty gentleman of good sense and well at court; a short, fat brown man, not forty years old."

On 21 March 1708, Lord Lovelace was appointed to the governorship of New York and New Jersey to replace Lord Cornbury. After a harrowing nine-week trans-Atlantic voyage Governor Lovelace, his wife and three sons John, Wentworth, and Neville arrived in New York on 18 December 1708. Well received by the Assemblies of both colonies, he proceeded to convict several of Cornbury's supporters, members of the corrupt Cornbury Ring, including former Governor Jeremiah Basse.

Lord Lovelace was granted £1,600 by a revenue bill on 5 May 1709. However, during the last month of his six-month tenure, two of the Governor's sons—John and Wentworth—died, probably of pneumonia, and he himself died on 6 May 1709. His funeral was held in Trinity Church, New York City and he was buried on 12 May in the Trinity Church Cemetery. His widow and two-year-old son Neville returned to London, where Lady Charlotte gave birth to Martha who was baptised in Westminster on 14 January 1710.

See also
 List of colonial governors of New Jersey
List of colonial governors of New York

References

External links
NJ State Library: John Lovelace

 Online article about Lovelace with the information that he was the grandson of Francis Lovelace

1672 births
1709 deaths
People from Hurley, Berkshire
Colonial governors of New Jersey
Governors of the Province of New York
John, Baron 4th
4
Burials at Trinity Church Cemetery
People of colonial New Jersey
People of the Province of New York
English emigrants